The 2000 DFB-Pokal Final decided the winner of the 1999–2000 DFB-Pokal, the 57th season of Germany's premier knockout football cup competition. It was played on 6 May 2000 at the Olympiastadion in Berlin. Bayern Munich won the match 3–0 against Werder Bremen to claim their 10th cup title.

Route to the final
The DFB-Pokal began with 64 teams in a single-elimination knockout cup competition. There were a total of six rounds leading up to the final. In the first two rounds, Bundesliga teams participating in European competitions were given a bye. Teams were drawn against each other, and the winner after 90 minutes would advance. If still tied, 30 minutes of extra time was played. If the score was still level, a penalty shoot-out was used to determine the winner.

Note: In all results below, the score of the finalist is given first (H: home; A: away).

Match

Details

References

External links
 Match report at kicker.de 
 Match report at WorldFootball.net
 Match report at Fussballdaten.de 

SV Werder Bremen matches
FC Bayern Munich matches
1999–2000 in German football cups
2000
May 2000 sports events in Europe
2000 in Berlin
Football competitions in Berlin